An Evening with Belafonte is a studio album by Harry Belafonte, released by RCA Victor in 1957.

Track listing
 "Merci Bon Dieu" (Frantz Casseus) – 2:54
 "Once Was" (Kennedy, Lorin) – 4:44
 "Hava Nageela" (traditional) – 3:14
 "Danny Boy" (Frederick Weatherly) – 5:48
 "The Drummer and the Cook" (Paul Campbell) – 3:55
 "Come O My Love" (traditional) – 4:23
 "Shenandoah" (traditional) – 3:45
 "Mary's Boy Child" (Jester Hairston) – 4:19
 "Cu Cu Ru Cu Cu Paloma" (Tomás Méndez) – 5:28
 "Eden Was Just Like This" (Kennedy, Lord Burgess) – 2:58
 "When the Saints Go Marching In" (traditional) – 3:39

Personnel
Harry Belafonte  – vocals
Millard Thomas – guitar
Frantz Casseus – guitar
Harry Sweets Edison – trumpet
Si Zentner – trombone
Will Lorin and His Orchestra
Production notes:
Henri René – producer
Dennis Farnon – producer
E. O. Welker – producer
John S. Wilson – liner notes

References

1957 albums
Harry Belafonte albums
RCA Victor albums
Albums produced by Henri René
Albums recorded at Radio Recorders